Nasser Kamel (born July 1959) is an Egyptian statesman. He currently serves as the Secretary General of the Union for the Mediterranean.

Previous roles include Ambassador of Egypt to France and Monaco as well as Ambassador of Egypt to the United Kingdom and North Ireland. Kamel also serving as Deputy Foreign Minister of Egypt for North African and Middle Eastern Affairs and briefly held the position of Chairman of the State Information Service.

Kamel holds the title of Grand Officier de l'ordre national du Mérite, an Order of State with membership (about 187,000 members) awarded by the President of the French Republic.

References

External links
Ministry of Foreign Affairs – Biography

1959 births
Ambassadors of Egypt to France
Ambassadors of Egypt to the United Kingdom
Living people
Diplomats from Cairo